Shelepikha may refer to:
Shelepikha (Moscow) , a historical area of the city of Moscow
Shelepikha (Moscow Central Circle), a station on the Moscow Central Circle line of the Moscow Metro
Shelepikha (Bolshaya Koltsevaya line), a station on the Bolshaya Koltsevaya line, a line of the Moscow Metro